Uggla ("owl") is the name of Swedish noble family, probably originating in the province of Västergötland. 

The oldest known holder of the surname was Claes Hansson, squire of Bosgården, who was recorded in 1515. After his grandson, Claes Arvidsson, the bailiff of Älvsborg, the family split into three main branches: the Finnish branch, the Krokstad branch in Bohuslän, and the Värmland branch. A grandson of Claes Arvidsson was Admiral Claes Uggla (1614-1676), who was made a friherre (baron) in 1676. He died later that year in a naval battle near the island of Öland.

Uggla is one of Sweden's most widespread noble families. As of 2013 there were 499 people named Uggla living in Sweden. See List of Swedish noble families.

Uggla may refer to:

People
 Ane Mærsk Mc-Kinney Uggla (born 1948), Swedish-Danish business executive 
 Claes Uggla (1614–1676), Swedish admiral
 Bertil Uggla (1890–1945), Swedish Olympic medalist, son of Gustaf Uggla
 Bengt Uggla (1894–1937), Swedish modern pentathlete, son of Gustaf Uggla
 Dan Uggla (born 1980), American baseball player
 Emilia Uggla (1819–1855), Swedish noble classical concert pianist and concert singer
 Gustaf Uggla (1846–1924), Swedish general
 Hjalmar Uggla (1908–1983), Polish soil scientist
 Magnus Uggla (born 1954), Swedish artist and composer
 Maria Aurora Uggla (1747–1826), Swedish lady in waiting

Other
 , two ships in the Swedish navy

References

Swedish-language surnames